Leppert is a surname. Notable people with the surname include:

Don Leppert (born 1931), American baseball player and coach
Don Leppert (1930–2021), American baseball player
Tom Leppert (born 1954), American businessman and politician